Paraclinus stephensi, the Professor blenny, is a species of labrisomid blenny native to the Pacific coast of Mexico where it can be found at depths of from near the surface to . The specific name honours the American biologist John S. Stephens Jr., who has extensively studied the Blenniiformes.

References

stephensi
Fish described in 1969
Fish of Mexican Pacific coast